Edgar Louis "Beaver" Laprade (October 10, 1919 – April 28, 2014) was a Canadian professional ice hockey centre who played for the New York Rangers in the National Hockey League. The son of Thomas and Edith Laprade, he was born in the New Ontario community of Mine Centre. By age 4, he and his family moved to Port Arthur, Ontario.  He also spent time with the Port Arthur Bearcats of the Thunder Bay Senior Hockey League.

Playing career

Laprade started his hockey career with the local Port Arthur Bruins in the Thunder Bay Junior A Hockey League. He was a prolific scorer with the team and he was frequently their best player. In 1938–39, Laprade joined the Port Arthur Bearcats in the Thunder Bay Senior Hockey League (TBSHL). Again, Laprade scored many times, and he was selected as the MVP of the TBSHL in 1938-39 and 1940–41. He also helped the team win the Allan Cup in 1939–40.

After the 1942–43 season, Laprade joined the army. While in the army, he still played hockey regularly with the Winnipeg Army. In 1944–45, he played one season with the Barriefield Bears before moving on to the National Hockey League with the New York Rangers. In his first season of NHL hockey, Laprade recorded 34 points in 49 games. His effort impressed the league and he was awarded the Calder Memorial Trophy. Laprade finished the 1946-47 NHL season with 40 points, and earned a spot in the first NHL All-Star Game. He also played in the 1948, 1949, and 1950 NHL All-Star Games.

During his career, Laprade played three full seasons without recording a penalty, and was awarded the Lady Byng Memorial Trophy in 1949-50. In the same season, the Rangers made it all the way to the Stanley Cup Finals against the Detroit Red Wings, the closest Laprade ever came to winning a Stanley Cup. The series went all the way to a Game 7 before Pete Babando of the Detroit Red Wings scored the game-winning goal in overtime. After that, Laprade played five more seasons with the Rangers before retiring. He was inducted into the Hockey Hall of Fame in 1993.

Life after hockey 
In 1939, he married Arline Whear, his coach's niece. The couple had three daughters.

After retiring from hockey, Laprade went into a partnership with Guy Perciante in operating a sporting goods store, Perciante & Laprade Sporting Goods Limited, in Thunder Bay, Ontario for 30 years. Perciante and Laprade also owned and managed an arena in Port Arthur.

He served as a member of Port Arthur and then Thunder Bay city council from 1959 to 1970 and again from 1972 to 1973. He also served on the board of governors for Confederation College and Lakehead University.

Laprade died at home in Thunder Bay at the age of 94 on April 28, 2014.

Awards and achievements
Selected as TBSHL MVP in 1939, and 1941.
Allan Cup champion in 1939.
Calder Memorial Trophy winner in 1946.
Played in 1947, 1948, 1949, and 1950 NHL All-Star Games.
Lady Byng Memorial Trophy winner in 1950.
Inducted into the Northwestern Ontario Sports Hall of Fame in 1982.
Inducted into the Hockey Hall of Fame in 1993.
 In the 2009 book 100 Ranger Greats, was ranked No. 24 all-time of the 901 New York Rangers who had played during the team's first 82 seasons

Career statistics

References

External links
 

1919 births
2014 deaths
Calder Trophy winners
Canadian ice hockey centres
Canadian military personnel of World War II
Hockey Hall of Fame inductees
Ice hockey people from Ontario
Sportspeople from Thunder Bay
Lady Byng Memorial Trophy winners
New York Rangers players
People from Rainy River District
Thunder Bay city councillors
Canadian expatriates in the United States